The Kabul Weekly was the most widely distributed newspaper in Afghanistan, both in the center and the provinces. It has ceased publication in 2011, with the sudden announcement printed on the front page of the last issue. Quote from the last issue: "While this is a column, I wanted to share with readers on the front page my decision to close down the Kabul Weekly.", Faheem Dashty, 30. of January 2011.

It was first started in 1991, but was closed after it published an article accusing the Mujahideen government in 1994. The newspaper restarted its circulation immediately after the fall of the Taliban and became the main newspaper read by the population of Afghanistan. 
The Kabul Weekly was published once a week on Wednesday in English, Dari (Persian) and Pashto.  It had a circulation of 10,000. 

It ceased publication in 2011.

External links 
Kabul Weekly
 Kabul Weekly website (Persian)    Website expired
Kabul Weekly website (English)     Latest shows 2008 publication

Weekly newspapers published in Afghanistan
Dari-language newspapers
Pashto-language newspapers
Persian-language newspapers
Mass media in Kabul
Publications established in 1991
1991 establishments in Afghanistan